National Olympic Committee of the Islamic Republic of Iran is a sports governing body situated in Tehran, Iran. It concerns the matters related to the Olympics.

The current president of National Olympic Committee of Iran is Mahmoud Khosravivafa, replacing Reza Salehi Amiri on January 15, 2018.

Presidents

See also
Iran at the Olympics
National Olympic Academy of Iran
I.R. Iran National Paralympic Committee

References

External links
Official website

Olympic
Iran
Iran at the Olympics
1947 establishments in Iran
Sports organizations established in 1947